Novy Mir is a rural locality (a village) in Miyakibashevsky Selsoviet, Miyakinsky District, Bashkortostan, Russia. The population was 304 as of 2010. There are 6 streets.

Geography 
Novy Mir is located 24 km northeast of Kirgiz-Miyaki (the district's administrative centre) by road. Nikolayevka is the nearest rural locality.

References 

Rural localities in Miyakinsky District